Levy House may refer to:

in the United States
George Levy House, Mobile, AL, listed on the NRHP in Alabama
Henry Levy House, Yuma, AZ, listed on the NRHP in Arizona
Henry Levy House, Oxnard, California, listed on the NRHP in California
Levy House (Reno, Nevada), listed on the NRHP in Nevada
Harry Milton Levy House, Cincinnati, OH, listed on the NRHP in Ohio
Soloman Levy House, Columbus, OH, listed on the NRHP in Ohio
Gaylord-Levy House, Victoria, TX, listed on the NRHP in Texas